The Guangdong Museum of Revolutionary History is a museum established in 1959 in Guangzhou, capital of China's Guangdong Province, located on the site of former Guangdong Advisory Bureau in the Second Guangzhou Uprising Martyrs Cemetery.

History
The foundation was first announced in 1959. The museum covers topics from the time of the First and Second Opium Wars to the People's Republic era. The museum has 17,117 items on display, 20,000 historical photos and 20 top-grade items.

See also
 List of museums in China

References

External links
 Official site
 Interior room tour

History museums in China
Museums in Guangzhou
1959 establishments in China